South Fork Township is a township in Wayne County, Iowa, USA.

History
South Fork Township is named from its location on that part of the river.

References

Townships in Wayne County, Iowa
Townships in Iowa